The 2019 Billboard Music Awards ceremony was held at the MGM Grand Garden Arena in Las Vegas, Nevada on May 1, 2019. It aired live on NBC and was hosted by Kelly Clarkson for a second year in a row. The list of nominees  were announced on April 4, 2019. Mariah Carey received the Icon Award during the show.

Performers

Winners and nominees
Winners are listed first and bold.

{| class=wikitable
|-
! style="background:#EEDD85; width=50%" | Top Artist
! style="background:#EEDD85; width=50%" | Top New Artist
! style="background:#EEDD82; width=50%" |Billboard Chart Achievement (fan-voted)
|-
| valign="top" |
Drake
Ariana Grande
Cardi B
Post Malone
Travis Scott
| valign="top" |
Juice Wrld
Bazzi
Dua Lipa
Ella Mai
Lil Baby
| valign="top" |
Ariana Grande
Dan + Shay
Drake
Lady Gaga and Bradley Cooper
Dua Lipa
|-
! style="background:#EEDD82; width=50%" |Top Male Artist
! style="background:#EEDD82; width=50%" |Top Female Artist
! style="background:#EEDD82; width=50%" |Top Streaming Artist
|-
| valign="top" |
Drake
Ed Sheeran
Post Malone
Travis Scott
XXXTentacion
| valign="top" |
Ariana Grande
Cardi B
Ella Mai
Halsey
Taylor Swift
| style="vertical-align:top;"|
Drake
Ariana Grande
Cardi B
Post Malone
XXXTentacion
|-
! style="background:#EEDD82; width=50%" |Top Duo/Group

! style="background:#EEDD82; width=50%" |Top Billboard 200 Artist
! style="background:#EEDD82; width=50%" |Top Radio Songs Artist
|-
| valign="top" |
BTS
Dan + Shay
Imagine Dragons
Maroon 5
Panic! at the Disco
| valign="top" |
Drake
Ariana Grande
Post Malone
Travis Scott
XXXTentacion
| valign="top" |
Drake
Ariana Grande
Cardi B
Post Malone
Maroon 5
|-
! style="background:#EEDD82; width=50%" |Top Billboard 200 Album
! style="background:#EEDD82; width=50%" |Top Hot 100 Artist
! style="background:#EEDD82; width=50%" |Top Social Artist (fan-voted)
|-
| valign="top" |
Scorpion – Drake? – XXXTentacion
Astroworld – Travis Scott
Beerbongs & Bentleys – Post Malone
Invasion of Privacy – Cardi B
| valign="top" |DrakeAriana Grande
Cardi B
Nicki Minaj
Post Malone
| valign="top" |BTSExo
Got7
Ariana Grande
Louis Tomlinson
|-
! style="background:#EEDD82; width=50%" |Top Hot 100 Song
! style="background:#EEDD82; width=50%" |Top Song Sales Artist
! style="background:#EEDD82; width=50%" |Top Touring Artist
|-
| valign="top" |"Girls Like You" – Maroon 5 featuring Cardi B"Better Now" – Post Malone
"I Like It" – Cardi B, Bad Bunny and J Balvin
"Lucid Dreams" – Juice Wrld
"Sicko Mode" – Travis Scott
| valign="top" |DrakeAriana Grande
Imagine Dragons
Lady Gaga
Post Malone
| valign="top" |Ed SheeranTaylor Swift
The Carters
Bruno Mars
Justin Timberlake
|-
! style="background:#EEDD82; width=50%" |Top R&B Artist
! style="background:#EEDD82; width=50%" |Top R&B Male Artist
! style="background:#EEDD82; width=50%" |Top R&B Female Artist
|-
| valign="top" |Ella MaiH.E.R.
Khalid
The Weeknd
XXXTentacion
| valign="top" |The WeekndKhalid
XXXTentacion
| valign="top" |Ella MaiH.E.R.
Queen Naija
|-
! style="background:#EEDD82; width=50%" |Top Rap Artist
! style="background:#EEDD82; width=50%" |Top Rap Male Artist
! style="background:#EEDD82; width=50%" |Top Rap Female Artist
|-
| valign="top" |DrakeCardi B
Juice Wrld
Post Malone
Travis Scott
| valign="top" |DrakePost Malone
Travis Scott
| valign="top" |Cardi BCity Girls
Nicki Minaj
|-
! style="background:#EEDD82; width=50%" |Top R&B Tour! style="background:#EEDD82; width=50%" |Top Rap Tour! style="background:#EEDD82; width=50%" |Top Rock Tour|-
| valign="top" |The CartersBruno Mars
Childish Gambino
| valign="top" |The CartersTravis Scott
Drake
| valign="top" |Elton JohnU2
The Rolling Stones
|-
! style="background:#EEDD82; width=50%" |Top Country Artist! style="background:#EEDD82; width=50%" |Top Country Male Artist! style="background:#EEDD82; width=50%" |Top Country Female Artist|-
| valign="top" |Luke CombsKane Brown
Jason Aldean
Florida Georgia Line
Dan + Shay
| valign="top" |Luke CombsKane Brown
Jason Aldean
| valign="top" |Carrie UnderwoodMaren Morris
Kacey Musgraves
|-
! style="background:#EEDD82; width=50%" |Top Country Tour! style="background:#EEDD82; width=50%" |Top Country Duo/Group! style="background:#EEDD82; width=50%" |Top Rock Artist|-
| valign="top" |Kenny ChesneyShania Twain
Luke Bryan
| valign="top" |Dan + ShayFlorida Georgia Line
Old Dominion
| valign="top" |Imagine DragonsPanic! at the Disco
Queen
Lovelytheband
Twenty One Pilots
|-
! style="background:#EEDD82; width=50%" |Top Dance/Electronic Artist! style="background:#EEDD82; width=50%" |Top Latin Artist! style="background:#EEDD82; width=50%" |Top Gospel Artist|-
| valign="top" |The ChainsmokersCalvin Harris
Kygo
Marshmello
Odesza
| valign="top" |OzunaJ Balvin
Romeo Santos
Anuel AA
Bad Bunny
| valign="top" |Tasha Cobbs LeonardTori Kelly
Marvin Sapp
Koryn Hawthorne
Kirk Franklin
|-
! style="background:#EEDD82; width=50%" |Top Christian Artist! style="background:#EEDD82; width=50%" |Top Soundtrack! style="background:#EEDD82; width=50%" |Top R&B Album|-
| valign="top" |Lauren DaigleFor King & Country
Hillsong Worship
MercyMe
Cory Asbury
| valign="top" |The Greatest Showman
Spider-Man: Into the Spider-Verse
Bohemian Rhapsody
A Star Is Born
13 Reasons Why: Season 2
| valign="top" |
'17 – XXXTentacionElla Mai – Ella Mai
My Dear Melancholy – The Weeknd
H.E.R. – H.E.R.
American Teen – Khalid 
|-
! style="background:#EEDD82; width=50%" |Top Gospel Album! style="background:#EEDD82; width=50%" |Top Country Album! style="background:#EEDD82; width=50%" |Top Christian Album|-
| valign="top" |Hiding Place – Tori KellySnoop Dogg Presents Bible of Love – Snoop Dogg & Various Artists
Gospel Greats – Aretha Franklin
Unstoppable – Koryn Hawthorne
Make Room – Jonathan McReynolds
| valign="top" |This One’s For You – Luke CombsRearview Town – Jason Aldean
Kane Brown – Kane Brown
Dan + Shay – Dan + Shay
Cry Pretty – Carrie Underwood
| valign="top" |Look Up Child – Lauren DaigleReckless Love – Cory Asbury
Burn the Ships – For King & Country
There Is More – Hillsong Worship
Chain Breaker – Zach Williams
|-
! style="background:#EEDD82; width=50%" |Top Rap Album! style="background:#EEDD82; width=50%" |Top Rock Album! style="background:#EEDD82; width=50%" |Top Latin Album|-
| valign="top" |
 Scorpion – Drake ? – XXXTentacion
 Astroworld – Travis Scott
 Beerbongs & Bentleys – Post Malone
 Invasion of Privacy – Cardi B
| valign="top" |Pray For The Wicked – Panic! at the Disco Come Tomorrow – Dave Matthews Band
 Origins – Imagine Dragons
 Delta – Mumford & Sons
 Trench – Twenty One Pilots
| valign="top" |
 Aura – Ozuna Real Hasta la Muerte – Anuel AA
 X 100pre – Bad Bunny
 Vibras – J Balvin
 F.A.M.E. – Maluma
|-
! style="background:#EEDD82; width=50%" |Top Dance/Electronic Album! style="background:#EEDD82; width=50%" |Top Streaming Song (Audio)! style="background:#EEDD82; width=50%" |Top Streaming Song (Video)|-
| valign="top" |
 Sick Boy – The Chainsmokers What Is Love? – Clean Bandit
 7 – David Guetta
 Kids in Love – Kygo
 Major Lazer Essentials – Major Lazer
| valign="top" |"Sicko Mode" – Travis Scott"I Like It" – Cardi B, Bad Bunny and J Balvin
"Lucid Dreams" – Juice Wrld
"Better Now" – Post Malone
"SAD!" – XXXTentacion
| valign="top" |"In My Feelings" – Drake"Lucid Dreams" – Juice Wrld
"Girls Like You" – Maroon 5 featuring Cardi B
"Sicko Mode" – Travis Scott
"SAD!" – XXXTentacion
|-
! style="background:#EEDD82; width=50%" |Top Collaboration! style="background:#EEDD82; width=50%" |Top Radio Song! style="background:#EEDD82; width=50%" |Top Selling Song|-
| valign="top" |"Girls Like You" – Maroon 5 featuring Cardi B"I Like It" – Cardi B, Bad Bunny and J Balvin
"Love Lies" – Khalid and Normani
"Psycho" – Post Malone featuring Ty Dolla Sign
"Happier" – Marshmello and Bastille
| valign="top" |"Girls Like You" – Maroon 5 featuring Cardi B"Love Lies" – Khalid and Normani
"Better Now" – Post Malone
"Meant to Be" – Bebe Rexha & Florida Georgia Line
"The Middle" – Zedd, Maren Morris and Grey
| valign="top" |"Girls Like You" – Maroon 5 featuring Cardi B"I Like It" – Cardi B, Bad Bunny and J Balvin
"In My Feelings" – Drake
"Without Me" – Halsey
"Shallow" – Lady Gaga and Bradley Cooper
|-
! style="background:#EEDD82; width=50%" |Top Rap Song! style="background:#EEDD82; width=50%" |Top Christian Song! style="background:#EEDD82; width=50%" |Top Gospel Song|-
| valign="top" |
"I Like It" – Cardi B, Bad Bunny and J Balvin"In My Feelings" – Drake
"Lucid Dreams" – Juice Wrld
"Better Now" – Post Malone
"Sicko Mode" – Travis Scott
| valign="top" |"You Say" – Lauren Daigle"Reckless Love" – Cory Asbury
"Joy" – For King & Country
"Who You Say I Am" – Hillsong Worship
"Known" – Tauren Wells
| valign="top" |"Won't He Do It" – Koryn Hawthorne"Your Great Name" – Todd Dulaney
"Never Alone" – Tori Kelly featuring Kirk Franklin
"Forever" – Jason Nelson
"A Great Work" – Brian Courtney Wilson
|-
! style="background:#EEDD82; width=50%" |Top R&B Song! style="background:#EEDD82; width=50%" |Top Country Song! style="background:#EEDD82; width=50%" |Top Rock Song|-
| valign="top" |"Boo'd Up" – Ella Mai"No Brainer" – DJ Khaled feat. Justin Bieber, Chance The Rapper & Quavo
"Trip" – Ella Mai
"Better" – Khalid
"Freaky Friday" – Lil Dicky feat. Chris Brown
| valign="top" |"Meant to Be" – Bebe Rexha & Florida Georgia Line"Heaven" – Kane Brown
"She Got the Best of Me" – Luke Combs
"Speechless" – Dan + Shay
"Tequila" – Dan + Shay
| valign="top" |"High Hopes" – Panic! at the Disco"Sit Next to Me" – Foster the People
"Natural" – Imagine Dragons
"Whatever It Takes" – Imagine Dragons
"Broken" – Lovelytheband
|-
! style="background:#EEDD82; width=50%" |Top Latin Song! style="background:#EEDD82; width=50%" |Top Dance/Electronic Song! style="background:#EEDD82; width=50%" |Icon Award|-
| valign="top" |"Te Boté" – Casper Magico, Nio Garcia, Darell, Nicky Jam, Bad Bunny & Ozuna"Mia" – Bad Bunny featuring Drake
"Dura" – Daddy Yankee
"Taki Taki" – DJ Snake feat. Selena Gomez, Ozuna and Cardi B
"X" – Nicky Jam and J Balvin
| valign="top" |"The Middle" – Zedd, Maren Morris and Grey"Taki Taki" – DJ Snake feat. Selena Gomez, Ozuna and Cardi B
"One Kiss" – Calvin Harris and Dua Lipa
"Happier" – Marshmello and Bastille
"Jackie Chan" – Tiësto and Dzeko feat. Preme and Post Malone
| valign="top" |Mariah Carey'	
|}

Multiple nominations and awards
The following received multiple awards:Twelve:DrakeSix:Cardi BFour:Maroon 5Three:Ella Mai
Luke Combs
Lauren Daigle
OzunaTwo:Ariana Grande
BTS
The Carters
The Chainsmokers
Panic! at the Disco

The following received multiple nominations:Twenty one:Cardi BSeventeen:Drake
Post MaloneTwelve:Travis ScottTen:XXXTentacionNine:Ariana GrandeEight:Bad Bunny
Dan + Shay
Ella Mai
J BalvinSeven:Juice Wrld
Maroon 5Six:Imagine Dragons
KhalidFive:Kane BrownFour:Florida Georgia Line
Luke Combs
Ozuna
Panic! at the DiscoThree:The Carters
Cory Asbury
Dua Lipa
For King & Country
H.E.R.
Hillsong Worship
Jason Aldean
Koryn Hawthorne
Lady Gaga
Lauren Daigle
Maren Morris
Marshmello
Tori Kelly
The WeekndTwo:''
Anuel AA
Bastille
Bebe Rexha
Bradley Cooper
Bruno Mars
BTS
Calvin Harris
Carrie Underwood
The Chainsmokers
DJ Snake
Ed Sheeran
Grey
Halsey
Kirk Franklin
Kygo
Lovelytheband
Normani
Selena Gomez
Taylor Swift
Twenty One Pilots
Zedd

References

Billboard Music Award
Billboard awards
2019 in Nevada
2019 music awards
Billboard Music Awards